Downtown Oklahoma City is located at the geographic center of the Oklahoma City metropolitan area and contains the principal, central business district of the region. Downtown Oklahoma City is the legal, financial, economic, nightlife, and entertainment center of the region.

Downtown Oklahoma City consists of several urban districts that ring the Central Business District; including the retail oriented A-Alley, the Arts District, the Bricktown Entertainment District, the Deep Deuce residential neighborhood, and the Flatiron District. Unofficial/new areas of downtown OKC include "Lower Bricktown", MidTown urban neighborhood, SOSA (South of Saint Anthony 'hospital'), WestTown, Film Row urban district, Farmer's Market, and the new Downtown South "Core-2-Shore" neighborhoods.

Much of downtown Oklahoma City's six districts are overlaid with the Downtown OKC Business Improvement District.

History

Downtown Oklahoma City is the location of the founding of the city when the area was opened for settlement in the Land Rush of 1889.

Beginning in the 1960s, downtown Oklahoma City underwent a major urban renewal initiative known as the Pei Plan. Over 500 buildings were demolished as a result.

Districts
Downtown Oklahoma City is divided into six districts.

Automobile Alley
Automobile Alley is located along Broadway just north of City Center. The district historically was home to many of the city's car dealerships of the early 20th century. Automobile Alley now hosts shops and restaurants. Automobile Alley covers .025 square miles with a population of 713 as of the 2020 United States census, a density of 2,852/square mile.

Bricktown
Bricktown is an entertainment district located just east of City Center. Initially founded as a warehouse district, Bricktown is now home to hotels, clubs, restaurants, residences, and offices. Bricktown has 329 residents within its 0.27 square miles, a density of 1,219/square mile.

City Center
City Center is the primary central business district and contains a large concentration of office space and the city's tallest buildings. 2,583 residents live within City Center's 0.53 square miles, a density of 4,874/square mile.

Deep Deuce
Deep Deuce is a residential district located to the north of Bricktown and east of City Center. Centered on NE 2nd Avenue, Deep Deuce was the hub of black culture and commerce. Apartments and condos now make up a majority of the district with a population of 1,384 inside an area of 0.11 square miles for a density of 12,582/square mile.

Midtown
Midtown Oklahoma City is located to the north of City Center. Midtown is a mixed-use district home to many restaurants, shops, offices, nightlife, housing, hotels, and medical facilities such as St. Anthony Hospital. Midtown has a population of 2,040 within the district's 0.54 square miles, for a density of 3,778/square mile.

West Village
West Village is centered on West Main Street and West Sheridan Avenue, just west of City Center. The district is home to the headquarters of the Oklahoma City Police Department. West Village covers an area of 0.16 square miles and has a population of 884, a density of 5,525/square mile.

Attractions

Artspace at Untitled
Automobile Alley Historic District
BC Clark, Oklahoma's oldest jeweler (founded in 1892)
Bricktown
Academy of Contemporary Music at University of Central Oklahoma
American Banjo Museum
Bass Pro Shops
Bricktown Canal Riverwalk
Bricktown Fountain
Bricktown Riverwalk Park
Chickasaw Bricktown Ballpark
Harkins Theatres
Centennial Land Run Monument
Campbell Art Park
Central Park (Union Park), to be developed in the Core-2-Shore/Downtown South
Century Center
Deep Deuce (original black downtown currently gentrified as an urban residential district)
Individual Artists of Oklahoma Gallery
Kerr Park
Midtown Oklahoma City
Myriad Botanical Gardens and Crystal Bridge Conservatory
Oklahoma City 89'Er Museum Park
Oklahoma City Civic Center
Bicentennial Park
City Hall
Civic Center Music Hall
Hightower Park
Oklahoma City Museum of Art
Oklahoma City National Memorial
Oklahoma Contemporary Arts Center (formerly City Arts Center)
Oklahoma River
RiverSport (formerly Boathouse) District
Finish Line Tower
Paycom Center
Plaza Court
Prairie Surf Studios
Rocktown Climbing Gym
Scissortail Park
Skydance Bridge
Triangle District
The Underground
WestTown
The Womb

Downtown living

Since the mid-1990s, residential housing has made a significant rebound in downtown Oklahoma City as numerous projects have been completed with many more proposed or are currently in development in each district. Examples of the various residential communities available today include:

City Place Tower, the Penthouses
Park Harvey Place
Civic
Steelyard
LIFT
The Frank
Edge @ MidTown
Metropolitan
Block 42
The Brownstones at Maywood Park
Central Avenue Villas
Centennial on the Canal
The Lofts at Maywood Park
Deep Deuce Apartment blocks
The Hill
Avana
The Montgomery
Regency Tower
Seiber Motor Hotel Residences
Sycamore Square Apartment Homes
SoSA neighborhood upscale modern residences

Architecture

BOK Park Plaza
Central High School, now Oklahoma City University Law School
Chase Tower, including the renowned Petroleum Club on top floors
City Place Tower
Civic Center Music Hall – the city's premier performing arts and auditory performance hall
Colcord Hotel, the city's first skyscraper
Devon Energy Center – Oklahoma's tallest skyscraper
Federal Reserve Bank
First Baptist Church, cathedral
First Lutheran Church, cathedral
First National Center
Kerr-McGee Tower (now SandRidge Energy headquarters)
Leadership Square, the city's largest leasable class A office complex
Littlepage Building-National Historic Site
Mid America Tower (Continental headquarters)
Oklahoma City Amtrak, Santa-Fe Depot (Intermodal Transit Center)
Oklahoma City Federal Building
Oklahoma City Museum of Art
Oklahoma City National Memorial
Oklahoma Tower
Paycom Center, home of the NBA's Oklahoma City Thunder
Petroleum Building
Renaissance Hotel
Ronald J. Norick Downtown Library
Saint Anthony Hospital campus
Saint Joseph's Old Cathedral
Saint Paul's Episcopal Cathedral
Sheraton Hotel
Skirvin Hilton Hotel
Union Bus Station, demolished
Union Station
U.S. Post Office, Courthouse, and Federal Office Building, on the National Register of Historic Places

Transportation
Downtown Oklahoma City is serviced by Embark, the city's public transit agency that operates city buses and the Oklahoma City Streetcar. 21 bus routes converge at the Downtown Transit Center, which had over 2,000 daily boardings in 2019. The streetcar has two routes, the downtown loop at 4.8 miles in length, and the Bricktown loop at 2 miles. Both streetcar loops are wholly contained to downtown.

The Santa Fe Depot is a train station located in City Center and services Amtrak's Heartland Flyer inter-city rail. The Heartland Flyer makes a daily round-trip from Oklahoma City to Fort Worth, Texas.

Six highway routes meet near downtown Oklahoma City at an interchange locally known as the Dallas Junction: I-35, I-40, I-235, US 62, US 77, and US 270.

Parks and recreation
Several parks and public spaces are located in downtown Oklahoma City:
Bricktown Canal
Bicentennial Park
Campbell Art Park
Hightower Park
Kerr Park
Myriad Botanical Gardens
Oklahoma City National Memorial
Red Andrews Park
Scissortail Park

Notable residents
Mick Cornett - former Mayor of Oklahoma City
J. Clifford Hudson - Chairman, President, and CEO of Sonic Drive-In

References

External links

Downtown Oklahoma City, Inc. under contract with the City of Oklahoma City to implement Business Improvement District initiatives in the CBD and surrounding urban districts
Oklahoma River Attractions and Redevelopment

 
Neighborhoods in Oklahoma City
Economy of Oklahoma City
Oklahoma City
Tourist attractions in Oklahoma City